Harardhere District is a district in the north-central Mudug region of Somalia. Its capital is Harardhere. 

The district has been controlled by the Al Qa'ida-linked terrorist group al-Shabaab since at least 2012. In 2018, as US airstrike killed 80 al-Shabaab fighters at a training camp in a rural area outside the town.

References

External links
 Districts of Somalia
 Administrative map of Harardhere District

Districts of Somalia

Mudug